The Madonna and Child is an oil painting on panel of 1495–1497 by Cima da Conegliano, now in the Petit Palais in Paris. It was owned in London by Sir William Abdy, then in Paris by Edward Tuck, the American vice-consul there; the latter gave it to its present owner in 1930.

Berenson, Von Hadeln, Lasareff and Menegazzi date the work to 1495 but Van Marle and Coletti date it to 1497.

References

1490s paintings
Paris
Paintings in the collection of the Petit Palais